Roseobacter denitrificans  is a species of aerobic pink-pigmented bacteria. It contains Bacteriochlorophyll a. It contains spheroidenone, does not synthesize bacteriochlorophyll anaerobically, but shows aerobic phototrophic activity. Cells are ovoid or rod-shaped and motile by subpolar flagella. R. litoralis does not reduce nitrate, while R. denitrificans does.

References

Further reading

External links

Type strain of Roseobacter denitrificans at BacDive -  the Bacterial Diversity Metadatabase

Thermophiles